Swenson can refer to:

Swenson (surname)
Swenson Gym, a field house at Weber State University, Utah
Swenson Red grape
Swenson, Texas, USA, an unincorporated community
USS Lyman K. Swenson (DD-729), U.S. naval destroyer
Swenson Arts and Technology High School, high school in Philadelphia, Pennsylvania, United States
Swensons, restaurant chain in Ohio, United States

See also
Svensson